Jefferson Township Local Schools is a school district in Ohio serving Jefferson Township in Montgomery County, Ohio. The School District includes Jefferson Junior/Senior High School and Blairwood Elementary School.

References

External links
Official Site

Education in Montgomery County, Ohio
School districts in Ohio